1,2,3-Trinitrobenzene is a nitrated benzene-derivative.

See also
 1,3,5-Trinitrobenzene

References

Nitrobenzenes